Vishal Warriors also known as Vishal Group Warriors was one of the first franchise team of the first edition POF the Everest Premier League. It was captained by a Nepal cricket captain Paras Khadka. The head coach of the team is Mahesh Rizal.The team manager was Raunaq B. Malla since 2014. Official Twitter account is @warriors_vishal .

Squad 
 Paras Khadka (c)
 Sagar Pun
 Manjeet Shrestha
 Raju Rijal
 Suraj Kurmi
 Ramnaresh Giri
 Yagyaman Kumal
 Deepesh Khatri
 Prakash KC
 Bhivatsu Thapa
 Adeel Khan
 Nurdhos Singh
 Irshad Ahmed
 Susan Bhari

References

External links 
 
 News about Vishal Warriors and NPL at ekantipur.com
 News about Vishal Warriors at cricketingnepal.com
 News about Vishal Warriors and NPL at thehimalayantimes.com
 Cricketlok
 Cricnepal.com

Everest Premier League
Cricket teams in Nepal
Cricket clubs established in 2014
2014 establishments in Nepal